The Carlton Inn was a former pub in Carlton, Melbourne, in the Australian state of Victoria, built . It was controversially illegally demolished without planning or heritage approval on the weekend of 15-16 October 2016.

Before demolition, it was one of the oldest buildings in the Carlton area. In its last years, it was known as the "Corkman Irish Pub".

History

Construction of the hotel was underway by early February 1856, as evidenced by an advertisement for bricks. The completed Carlton Inn was licensed in 1856 to George Edmonds. Soon after it was transferred to John Cozens. The Noble family were proprietors for about a century from 1863, when a Mrs Noble was listed as owner in the rate books, through to William K. Noble of Mirboo who was owner in 1923 to 1936, and then the estate of W. K. Noble in 1954.

In 1933, architects Thomas Watts & Sons designed a new rear addition valued at £500 including new kitchen, and alterations to the front bar. The works were carried out by builder G. G. Edwards of North Brighton. In 1936, a new two-storey section was built on the eastern boundary costing £700. Additional bedrooms and relocation of the kitchen (which had previously been a billiard room), were undertaken by Harry J. Johnston with designs by architect J. A. Trencher of Caulfield. In 1954, architect Harry J. Little designed further alterations, including single-storey sections for laundry, toilets, garage and fuel store, replacing former outbuildings. Building was undertaken by R. J. Johnstone of Mitcham.

In its last years, the hotel was known as the "Corkman Irish Pub", with a large student clientele, and traditional Irish music sessions.

The site is included in the City of Melbourne Heritage Overlay (HO85), where it is described as:

A nearby building proposal was objected by the Carlton Association due to the impact it would have had to the adjacent heritage places, including the Carlton Inn.

Building
The Carlton Inn was a two-storey brick-and-bluestone hotel with rendered façades in a simple Georgian style. It had a brown tiled dado on the Pelham and Leicester Street façades, and a balustered parapet with urns.

Demolition
In August 2016, the hotel was purchased for $4.76 million ($1.76 million above reserve) by a company known as '160 Leicester Pty Ltd', owned by Stefce Kutlesovski and Raman Shaqiri. A suspicious fire broke out in the hotel on 8 October, and on Saturday morning 15 October, demolition was commenced by Shaq Demolitions and Excavations. A Melbourne City Council official attended the site and spoke to Stefce Kutlesovski, who was on site overseeing the demolition, and told him to cease the demolition. Stefce Kutlesovski refused, responding “It’s my site, I can do whatever I want.”  A stop order was then issued by the City of Melbourne officer on Saturday, but the demolition contractors returned on Sunday, ignored it and completed the demolition.

Court action against Kutlesovski and Shaqiri 
Following the demolition, the two were fined over $600,000 for breaches of the Environment Protection Act for illegal dumping of asbestos contaminated material following a successful prosecution by the EPA. Other charges by other regulators such as the Victorian Building Authority and Melbourne City Council are being pursued separately so further significantly fines may follow. The magistrate said in court he would have jailed them, but the law only allowed for fines. Raman Shaqiri was admonished in the court for smirking and trying to out-stare the magistrate. Stefce Kutlesovski and Raman Shaqiri removed asbestos from the site and dumped it on another location, near a school and residential buildings, endangering the people in the vicinity.
The pair appeared again in court in 2019, and this time were fined a further $1.32 million for the demolition following a successful prosecution by the Victoria Building Authority. The fine was large so as to dissuade other developers from similar practices. The barrister representing the Government noted a lack of contrition by the pair, who had initially agreed to rebuild the pub, but then not only refused to, but made a legal challenge to the rebuild order, indicating they had no interest in doing it.

In September 2019, the pair appealed the fines in Sunshine Magistrates court, which saw the presiding magistrate, Judge Wraight, reduce the fines. The defendants allegedly showed no remorse, and one of the defendants chose not to not show up at court.

Stefce Kutlesovski and Raman Shaqiri were both sentenced to Jail for contempt of court in December 2020. The contempt charge related to them not building a park which had been required, as part of the deal, and that they generally showed “No apology, no remorse and no contrition”. The pair then completed the park, only after being sentenced to jail, as a last attempt to evade a jail sentence. The park is only temporary and will be demolished to build apartments. The judge in the case remarked that they had to be “dragged every step of the way to compliance”.

Reaction and rebuilding campaign

The demolition of the Carlton Inn received extensive media coverage in state and national radio, television and print news media, with both the Victorian Planning Minister Richard Wynne and Lord Mayor of Melbourne Robert Doyle conducting media interviews on the site. Councillor Doyle referred to the illegal demolition as "the most brazen and wanton act of vandalism" he had seen in his political career.

In response to the incident, several calls were made for increasing penalties for illegal demolition. An investigation by the Victorian Environment Protection Authority confirmed the presence of asbestos on the site.

Victorian Planning Minister Richard Wynne initially sought to have the pair rebuild the building through court action in the Victorian Civil and Administrative Tribunal. Wynne eventually scrapped initial plans to try and compel Shaqiri and Kutlesovsky to have the pub rebuilt, instead allowing them to build a 12-storey tower on the site, for which he received harsh criticism in the media. It was estimated that the developers would receive huge financial benefits.  The deal allowed the "cowboy developers" to not have to rebuild the pub at all on the condition that the new tower development is completed before 2022. A further condition was that the site must be landscaped as a temporary public park. This was not done and as a result Contempt of Court proceedings were instigated in January 2020. 
Shaqiri and Kutlesovski were convicted of Contempt of Court in November 2020, and were sentenced on 15 December 2020 to jail and fined $150,000 with $250,000 costs awarded against them.
 
Critics of the developers, including parties to the case, were disappointed with the deal, saying that the deal Wynne reached with them was no disincentive for rogue developers. Crikey's Guy Rundle lamented that the pair were likely to make "millions" from the deal they had struck to build a 12-story tower on the site.

Following Wynne and the council's decision to allow the developers to develop the site and build a 12-story tower, the state opposition and planning groups demanded that the Government compulsorily acquire the site, which was within their legal power to do so under section 172 of the Planning and Environment Act 1987. It was argued this was the main method of setting a precedent and sending a message to further rogue developers.

In December 2020 Stefce Kutlesovski and Raman Shaqiri were both sentenced to Jail for contempt of court. This was for their non compliance to turn the site into a park, the court order for which they simply ignored. The two so called "cowboy developers" were going to appeal. 

A planning application for a three storey hotel, designed by Six Degrees  with two basement levels was lodged for the site in late 2022.

See also
Carlton Tavern, Kilburn

References

External links
 Image - Fowler, Lyle & Commercial Photographic Co (photographers.) (1957). Carlton Inn Hotel, cnr. Pelham & Leicester sts., Carlton

1856 establishments in Australia
2016 disestablishments in Australia
Buildings and structures demolished in 2016
Former pubs in Australia
Heritage sites in Melbourne
Hotel buildings completed in 1856
Hotels disestablished in 2016
Pubs in Melbourne
Defunct hotels in Australia
Demolished buildings and structures in Melbourne